Suresh Joachim Arulanantham (born August 17, 1968) is a Canadian film actor, producer, and multiple-Guinness World Record holder who has broken more than 60 world records.

World records
Farthest distance run, whilst carrying a 4.5 kg brick in a nominated ungloved hand in an uncradled downward position. Joachim traveled 126.675 km around the Westfield Hornsby mall on Florence Street in Hornsby, New South Wales, Australia.

A broadcast by Joachim on Geethavaani Tamil Radio in Toronto, Ontario, Canada, lasted for a record 120 hours. It was broadcast between 4 p.m. on 23 June and 4 p.m. on 28 June 2003.

On March 17, 2006, he set the world record for a couple dance marathon by dancing 31 hours consecutively with Tiffany Lesko.

Basketball dribbling distance in 24 hours.

Other Guinness-acknowledged records
 Travelled  on a treadmill in 12 hours on 28 July 2002 at Crown Promenade, Melbourne, Victoria, Australia
 The longest drumming marathon by an individual lasted for 84 hours and was achieved from 1 to 4 February 2004 at the Magic Factory, Zürich, Switzerland
 Travelled  on a treadmill in one week at Waou Club Med Gym, Paris, France between 31 July and 7 August 2004
 Longest continuous crawl of 56.62 km (35.18 mi)
 Broke the Guinness World Record with Claudia Wavra of Germany for movie watching with a final time of 123 hours and 10 minutes on October 7, 2008. Both received $10,000 for their achievement.
He produced and starred in a Tamil language Indian film titled Sivappu Mazhai (2009) in attempt to break the record for the fastest shooting time for a feature film.

Filmography

Documentary

References

External links

 Suresh Joachim official site
 Suresh Joachim International official site

Canadian people of Sri Lankan Tamil descent
Canadian film directors
Living people
Canadian male film actors
Sri Lankan emigrants to Canada
Tamil male actors
1968 births
Asian-Canadian filmmakers